The Cégep Garneau is a public French-language college in Quebec City, Quebec, Canada.

History
The college traces its origins to the merger of several institutions which became public ones in 1967, when the Quebec system of public colleges was created. It was established in 1969 by the merger of the Collège des Jésuites (Jesuit College) and  École normale Laval (Laval Normal school) and was until 2012 known as Collège François-Xavier-Garneau.

The college was named for François-Xavier Garneau, a nineteenth-century French Canadian notary, poet and historian.

Programs

The college offers two types of programs: pre-university and technical.

The pre-university programs, which take two years to complete, cover the subject matters which roughly correspond to the additional year of high school given elsewhere in Canada in preparation for a chosen field in university.

The technical programs, which take three years to complete, apply to students who wish to be career-ready. However, many students choose to pursue a university degree. In addition, the Continuing Education Centre offers a wide variety of credit courses and programs with flexible scheduling.

Partnerships
The College of General and Vocational Education is affiliated with the Association of Canadian Community Colleges (ACCC) and the Canadian Colleges Athletic Association (CCAA).

Notable alumni
 Stéphane Dion 
 Joseph Facal

Athletics
The François-Xavier-Garneau Élans are the athletic teams that represent Collège François-Xavier-Garneau in Quebec City, Quebec, Canada. They compete with other schools in Réseau du sport étudiant du Québec (RSEQ).

The college also participates in the Canadian Colleges Athletic Association.

See also
 List of colleges in Quebec
 Higher education in Quebec

References

External links

Cégep Garneau

Garneau
Education in Quebec City
Buildings and structures in Quebec City